Wayne Leo Ducheneaux (September 25, 1936 – December 17, 2012) was a rancher, United States Marine, and leader of the Cheyenne River Sioux Tribe, being elected to the tribal council in 1966 and as its chairman for two terms the first from 1974–1978 and the second from 1986–1990.  He served as president of the National Congress of American Indians from 1990 to 1991.

References 

1936 births
2012 deaths
Native American leaders